is a former Japanese football player.

Playing career
Nakano was born in Marugame on March 29, 1976. After graduating from National Institute of Fitness and Sports in Kanoya, he joined Japan Football League club Albirex Niigata in 1998. He became a regular player as left side back from first season. The club was promoted to new league J2 League from 1999. Although he played many matches until 2000, he could not play many matches in 2001. In 2002, he moved to Prefectural Leagues club Japan Soccer College. The club was promoted to Regional Leagues from 2003. He retired end of 2003 season.

Club statistics

References

External links

1976 births
Living people
National Institute of Fitness and Sports in Kanoya alumni
Association football people from Kagawa Prefecture
Japanese footballers
J2 League players
Japan Football League (1992–1998) players
Albirex Niigata players
Japan Soccer College players
Association football defenders